Crooked Harbour or Kat O Hoi is a harbour at the northeast of New Territories, Hong Kong. The harbour is connected to Double Haven and the bigger sea of Mirs Bay. Crooked Island, also known as Kat O, and several islands, including Ap Chau, form the harbour with the mainland New Territories.

Islands
Islands of Crooked Harbour include:

 Ap Chau
 Ap Chau Mei Pak Tun Pai
 Ap Chau Pak Tun Pai
 Ap Lo Chun
 Ap Tan Pai
 Ap Tau Pai
 Cheung Shek Tsui
 Fun Chau
 Kat O
 Lo Chi Pai
 Sai Ap Chau
 Siu Nim Chau
 Tai Nim Chau

Ecology 
Wave-cut "benches" of 6 to 10 meters wide form along the sediment layers at Crooked Harbor and Ping Chau, which are uncommon elsewhere in Hong Kong's coastline.

Eelgrasses discovered at Lai Chi Wo in 1977 were granted protection by the Agricultural and Fisheries Department of the Hong Kong government. Periclimenes demani, a small species of shrimp, resides in this grass.

Historical event 
On 8 June 1857, a British naval frigate encountered pirates at Crooked Harbor, 70 men leapt overboard and were massacred on land.

References 

Ports and harbours of Hong Kong
North District, Hong Kong